Nemapogon meridionella is a moth of the family Tineidae. It is found in Ukraine.

References

Moths described in 1962
Nemapogoninae
Endemic fauna of Ukraine